Annadel (also spelled Annadell) is an unincorporated community in Morgan County, Tennessee, United States. Annadel is located on US 27 south of Sunbright.

References

Unincorporated communities in Morgan County, Tennessee
Unincorporated communities in Tennessee